Aiee! The Phantom is an album by American jazz pianist/composer Horace Tapscott recorded in 1995 and released on the Arabesque label.

Reception

AllMusic awarded the album 4½ stars with its review by Scott Yanow stating, "Falling between post bop and the avant-garde, Tapscott plays locally with a blazing (if thus far undocumented) quartet... Perhaps this recording (available from Arabesque) will alert the rest of the jazz world as to the strong talents of the great veteran Horace Tapscott".

Track listing
All compositions by Horace Tapscott except as indicated
 "To the Great House" - 7:52
 "The Goat and Ram Jam" (Jesse Sharps) - 8:54
 "Aiee! The Phantom" - 10:31
 "Drunken Mary/Mary on Sunday" - 9:30
 "Inspiration of Silence" (Ernest Straughter) - 6:42
 "Mothership" - 15:52

Personnel
Horace Tapscott - piano
Marcus Belgrave - trumpet
Abraham Burton - alto saxophone
Reggie Workman - bass
Andrew Cyrille - drums

References

Arabesque Records albums
Horace Tapscott albums
1996 albums